Acerodon (meaning: Sharp-tooth) is a genus of bats in the family Pteropodidae containing five species, all native to forests in Southeast Asia, and all considered threatened. They are closely related to Pteropus.

Species

Genus Acerodon
 Sulawesi flying fox, A. celebensis
 Talaud flying fox, A. humilis
 Giant golden-crowned flying fox, A. jubatus
 Palawan fruit bat, A. leucotis
 Sunda flying fox, A. mackloti

References

 
Bat genera
Taxa named by Claude Jourdan
Taxonomy articles created by Polbot